In mathematics, nilpotent orbits are generalizations of nilpotent matrices that play an important role
in representation theory of real and complex semisimple Lie groups and semisimple Lie algebras.

Definition 
An element X of a semisimple Lie algebra g is called nilpotent if its adjoint endomorphism

 ad X: g → g,   ad X(Y) = [X,Y]

is nilpotent, that is, (ad X)n = 0 for large enough n. Equivalently, X is nilpotent if its characteristic polynomial pad X(t) is equal to tdim g.

A semisimple Lie group or algebraic group G acts on its Lie algebra via the adjoint representation, and the property of being nilpotent is invariant under this action. A nilpotent orbit is an orbit of the adjoint action such that any (equivalently, all) of its elements is (are) nilpotent.

Examples 
Nilpotent  matrices with complex entries form the main motivating case for the general theory, corresponding to the complex general linear group. From the Jordan normal form of matrices we know that each nilpotent matrix is conjugate to a unique matrix with Jordan blocks of sizes  where  is a partition of n. Thus in the case n=2 there are two nilpotent orbits, the zero orbit consisting of the zero matrix and corresponding to the partition (1,1) and the principal orbit consisting of all non-zero matrices A with zero trace and determinant, 
  with 
corresponding to the partition (2). Geometrically, this orbit is a two-dimensional complex quadratic cone in four-dimensional vector space of  matrices minus its apex.

The complex special linear group is a subgroup of the general linear group with the same nilpotent orbits. However, if we replace the complex special linear group with the real special linear group, new nilpotent orbits may arise.

Properties 
 Nilpotent orbits can be characterized as those orbits of the adjoint action whose Zariski closure contains 0. 
 Nilpotent orbits are finite in number.
 The Zariski closure of a nilpotent orbit is a union of nilpotent orbits. 
 Jacobson–Morozov theorem: over a field of characteristic zero, any nilpotent element e can be included into an sl2-triple {e,h,f} and all such triples are conjugate by ZG(e), the centralizer of e in G. Together with the representation theory of sl2, this allows one to label nilpotent orbits by finite combinatorial data, giving rise to the Dynkin–Kostant classification of nilpotent orbits.

Poset structure 

Nilpotent orbits form a partially ordered set: given two nilpotent orbits, O1 is less than or equal to O2 if O1 is contained in the Zariski closure of O2. This poset has a unique minimal element, zero orbit, and unique  
maximal element, the regular nilpotent orbit, but in general, it is not a graded poset. 
If the ground field is algebraically closed then the zero orbit is covered by a unique orbit, called the minimal orbit, and the regular orbit covers a unique orbit, called the subregular orbit.

In the case of the special linear group SLn, the nilpotent orbits are parametrized by the partitions of n. By a theorem of Gerstenhaber, the ordering of the orbits corresponds to the dominance order on the partitions of n. Moreover, if G is an isometry group of a bilinear form, i.e. an orthogonal or symplectic subgroup of SLn, then its nilpotent orbits are parametrized by partitions of n satisfying a certain parity condition and the corresponding poset structure is induced by the dominance order on all partitions (this is a nontrivial theorem, due to Gerstenhaber and Hesselink).

See also 
Adjoint representation

References 
David Collingwood and  William McGovern. Nilpotent orbits in semisimple Lie algebra. Van Nostrand Reinhold Mathematics Series. Van Nostrand Reinhold Co., New York, 1993. 
 
 .
 .
 .

Lie algebras